Category 1 is the lowest classification on the Australian tropical cyclone intensity scale and is used to classify tropical cyclones, that have 10-minute sustained winds of .  tropical cyclones have peaked as Category 1 tropical cyclones in the South Pacific tropical cyclone basin, which is denoted as the part of the Pacific Ocean to the south of the equator and to the east of 160°E.  This list does include any tropical cyclones that went on to peak as a Category 4 or 5 severe tropical cyclone, while in the Southern Pacific tropical cyclone basin.

Background
The South Pacific tropical cyclone basin is located to the south of the Equator between 160°E and 120°W. The basin is officially monitored by the Fiji Meteorological Service and the New Zealand MetService, while other meteorological services such as the Australian Bureau of Meteorology, Météo-France as well as the United States Joint Typhoon Warning Center also monitor the basin. This scale is only officially used in American Samoa, however, various agencies including NASA also use it to compare tropical cyclones. A Category 3 tropical cyclone is expected to cause catastrophic devastation, if it significantly impacts land at or near its peak intensity.

Systems

1970's

|-
| Isa ||  ||  ||  || Solomon Islands || || ||
|-
| Priscilla ||  ||  ||  || Fiji || Minor || Unknown ||
|-
| Fiona ||  ||  ||  || Queensland, New Caledonia || || ||
|-
| Vivienne ||  ||  ||  || French Polynesia ||  ||  ||
|-
| Collette ||  ||  ||  || || || ||
|-
| Felicity ||  ||  ||  || || || ||
|-
| Glenda ||  ||  ||  || || || ||
|-
| Henrietta ||  ||  ||  || || || ||
|-
| SP7301 ||  ||  ||  || || || ||
|-
| Monica ||  ||  ||  || || || ||
|-
| Nessie ||  ||  ||  || || || ||
|-
| Hope ||  ||  ||  || || || ||
|-
| Jan ||  ||  ||  || || || ||
|-
| Unnamed ||  ||  ||  || || || ||
|-
| Unnamed ||  ||  ||  || || || ||
|-
| Tessa ||  ||  ||  || French Polynesia || || ||
|}

1980's

|-
| Rae ||  ||  ||  || Vanuatu || || ||
|-
| Wally ||  ||  ||  || Fiji ||  ||  ||
|-
| Diola
|-
| Betsy
|-
| Unnamed
|-
| Diola
|-
| Claudia ||  ||  ||  || Solomon Islands || None || None ||
|-
| Kina ||  ||  ||  || None || None || None ||
|-
| Prema ||  ||  ||  || Cook Islands, French Polynesia || Minor || None ||
|-
|  || December 27–30 ||  ||  || || || ||
|-
|  || January 18 – 20, 1984 || ||  || None || None || None ||
|-
|  || February 20 – 24, 1984 ||  ||  || None || None || None ||
|-
|  || March 16 – 21, 1984 ||  ||  || Fiji || Minor || None ||
|-
|  || March 23 – 30, 1984 ||  ||  || || || ||
|-
|  ||  ||  ||  || ||  ||  ||
|-
|  ||  ||  ||  || || || ||
|-
| Keli
|-
| Lusi
|-
| Alfred
|-
| Veli
|-
| Blanch(e) ||  ||  ||  || Solomon Islands || None || None ||
|-
| Agi ||  ||  ||  || Vanuatu, New Caledonia ||  || None ||
|-
| Gina ||  ||  ||  || Samoan Islands ||  || || 
|-
| Meena ||  ||  ||  || Cape York Peninsula || Minor || None ||
|}

1990's

|-
| Nancy
|-
| Hettie ||  ||  ||  || French Polynesia || Minimal || None ||
|-
| Mick ||  ||  ||  || Tonga, Fiji, New Zealand || Minimal || None ||
|-
| Oli ||  ||  ||  || || || ||
|-
| Gertie ||  ||  ||  || None || None || None ||
|-
| Yasi ||  ||  ||  || Fiji, Tonga || Minor || None ||
|-
| Zaka ||  ||  ||  || New Caledonia || Minor || None ||
|-
| Atu ||  ||  ||  || New Caledonia || Minor || None ||
|-
| Cyril ||  ||  ||  || Solomon Islands, New Caledonia || || ||
|-
| Ian ||  ||  ||  || Fiji || None || Minimal ||
|-
| Tui ||  ||  ||  || Samoan islands ||  ||  ||
|-
| Alan ||  ||  ||  || French Polynesia ||  ||  ||
|-
| Bart ||  ||  ||  || French Polynesia ||  Minor ||  ||
|-
| Ella ||  ||  ||  || Solomon Islands, Vanuatu, New Caledonia || || ||
|-
| Gita ||  ||  ||  || None || None || None ||
|}

2000's

|-
| Neil ||  ||  ||  || Fiji || None || None ||
|-
| Rita || February 27 – March 5, 2001 ||  ||  || 
|-
| Trina || November 29 –December 3, 2001 ||  ||  || Cook Islands, French Polynesia ||  ||  ||
|-
| Vicky || December 22–26 ||  ||  || None ||  None ||  ||
|-
| Yolande ||  ||  ||  || Tonga || None || None ||
|-
| Cilla ||  ||  ||  || Fiji, Tonga || Minimal || None ||
|-
| Judy ||  ||  ||  ||  || || ||
|-
| Lola ||  ||  ||  || || || ||
|-
| Rae ||  ||  ||  || || || ||
|-
| Sheila ||  ||  ||  || || || ||
|-
| Tam ||  ||  ||  || || || ||
|-
| Hettie ||  ||  ||  || || || ||
|-
| Innis ||  ||  ||  || Vanuatu, New Caledonia ||  ||  || 
|}

2010's

|-
| Nisha ||  ||  ||  || Samoan Islands, Southern Cook Islands || || ||
|-
| Sarah ||  ||  ||  || Cook Islands || || ||
|-
| Haley ||  ||  ||  || Cook Islands || || ||
|-
| June ||  ||  ||  || Solomon Islands, New Caledonia, New Zealand || || ||
|-
| Mike ||  ||  ||  || Cook Islands || || ||
|-
| Reuben ||  ||  ||  || Fiji, Tonga ||  ||  ||
|-
| Tuni ||  ||  ||  || Tuvalu, Samoan Islands, Niue, Tonga ||  ||  ||
|-
| Yalo ||  ||  ||  || Cook Islands, French Polynesia ||  ||  ||
|-
| Bart ||  ||  ||  || Southern Cook Islands ||  ||  ||
|}

2020's

|-
| Fehi ||  ||  ||  || New Caledonia, New Zealand ||  ||  ||
|-
| Iris ||  ||  ||  || Solomon Islands ||  ||  ||
|-
| Josie ||  ||  ||  || Vanuatu, Fiji, Tonga ||  ||  ||
|-
| Liua ||  ||  ||  || Solomon Islands ||  ||  ||
|-
| Neil ||  ||  ||  || Wallis and Futuna, Fiji, Tonga ||  ||  ||
|-
| Vicky ||  ||  ||  || Samoan Islands, Niue ||  ||  || 
|-
| Bina ||  ||  ||  || Solomon Islands, Vanuatu, Fiji ||  ||  || 
|-
| 13F ||  ||  ||  || New Caledonia ||  ||  || 
|-
| Eva ||  ||  ||  || Vanuatu, New Caledonia ||  ||  ||  
|-
| Gina ||  ||  ||  || Vanuatu ||  ||  || 
|-
| Hale ||  ||  ||  || New Caledonia ||  ||  || 
|}

Other systems
Tropical Cyclone Raquel (2014) and Tropical Cyclone Linda (2018) developed into Category 1 tropical cyclones, as they moved out of the basin and into the Australian Region.

See also
List of Category 1 Atlantic hurricanes
List of Category 1 Pacific hurricanes

Notes

References

External links

South Pacific